Llandeilo railway station (formerly Llandilo Junction for the Carmarthen Line) serves the town of Llandeilo, Carmarthenshire.

The station is located below the eastern side of the town beside the River Tywi. Dinefwr Castle is within walking distance. All trains serving the station are operated by Transport for Wales.

History
The station was built by the Llanelly Railway, who reached the town from the Llanelli direction in January 1857. An extension to Llandovery was constructed by the subsidiary Vale of Towy Railway (opening in 1858), whilst the branch line to Carmarthen followed in 1864–65 and a direct line to  along the Gower Peninsula in 1866–/67. The following year saw the Central Wales Extension Railway reach Llandovery, putting Llandeilo on a through route to  but also giving the London and North Western Railway (LNWR) access to the Llanelly company's territory and lines through a new joint lease of the VoTR. The LNWR took full advantage of this and by 1873 had secured full access to & control of the Swansea and Carmarthen routes, leaving the Llanelly Railway with only half its peak track mileage and in such a poor financial position that it was forced to lease its remaining lines to the Great Western Railway the same year. Thereafter the LNWR became the main passenger operator, with the Great Western running just a few trains between Llanelli and Llandovery.

In its heyday, the station had four platforms, used by trains for the Heart of Wales line as well as trains from Carmarthen via the Llandeilo – Abergwili Junction branch line (closed in 1963). The direct line to Swansea Victoria has also gone and the surviving passenger trains now run via the old Llanelly Railway main line south of Pontarddulais and the West Wales Line to reach Swansea.

The station building has been demolished, and between 2008 and the spring of 2010 only one platform was in use as the passing loop here had been temporarily locked out of use due to a lack of spare parts for the (obsolete) point machines. The second (southbound) platform was reinstated in May 2010 along with the loop following the replacement of the points at both ends with new electrically worked units. (All five loops were treated as part of a renewal programme costing over £4 million.)

Facilities
The station is unstaffed (so tickets must be purchased on the train) and has only basic amenities - waiting shelters, timetable poster boards and digital CIS screens on each side, along with a customer help point on platform 2. Access for disabled passengers is limited, due to the barrow crossing linking the platforms and steep access ramps.

Services
There are four trains a day in each direction southbound to Swansea and northbound to Shrewsbury from Monday to Saturday; a fifth service runs to Llandovery and back to Swansea in the a.m peak (except Saturdays). The facility to pass northbound and southbound trains is used once each early weekday morning. Two trains each way call on Sundays.

Notes

Further reading

External links 

Railway stations in Carmarthenshire
DfT Category F1 stations
Former Great Western Railway stations
Railway stations in Great Britain opened in 1857
Heart of Wales Line
Railway stations served by Transport for Wales Rail
Llandeilo
1857 establishments in Wales